Stefan Lewis Scougall (born 7 December 1992) is a Scottish professional footballer who plays as an attacking midfielder for Scottish League One club Alloa Athletic.

Born in Edinburgh, Scougall began his professional career with Livingston. He has since also played for Sheffield United, Fleetwood Town, St Johnstone and Carlisle United. He has also represented his country at under 21 level.

Club career

Livingston

Scougall won the SFL under-19 League in 2010–11. After playing youth football for Hibernian and Dunfermline Athletic, Scougall made his senior debut for Livingston on 16 October 2010 as a substitute in a 4–1 win against Stenhousemuir in the Scottish Second Division, making two further appearances that season as Livingston sealed the Second Division title. Scougall became a regular for the West Lothian side the following season in the First Division, and was rewarded with a new long-term contract in September 2012, designed to keep him at Almondvale until the summer of 2016. Scougall's performances for Livingston saw him attract the attention of scouts from Arsenal and Swansea City, and in April 2013, Scougall was one of four players to be nominated for the Scottish First Division Player's Player of the Year award for the 2012–13 season.

Sheffield United
In January 2014, Scougall joined English club Sheffield United, signing a three-and-a-half-year deal, for an undisclosed fee. Scougall made his debut for United in a FA Cup tie against Fulham on 26 January, coming on as a half time substitute. Scougall's first goal in United colours came on 8 February 2014 against Shrewsbury Town at Bramall Lane. Scougall was part of the Sheffield United team that reached the FA Cup semi final, played at Wembley Stadium, and scored Sheffield United's second goal in a 5–3 defeat at the hands of Hull City.

Scougall was released by Sheffield United in May 2017.

St Johnstone
On 17 June 2017, Scougall signed a two-year deal with St Johnstone.

Carlisle United
Scougall signed for Carlisle United on short-term deal on 31 January 2019 after being released by St Johnstone. He was offered a new contract by Carlisle at the end of the 2018–19 season. He signed a new one-year contract with the club in June 2019.

Alloa Athletic
Scougall signed for Scottish Championship club Alloa Athletic in October 2020/21.

International career
On 8 October 2012, Scougall was named in the Scotland under-21 squad for two friendly matches against the USA and Canada, and duly made his debut on 12 October 2012 against the USA. Scougall was once again named in the Scotland under-21 squad to face Greece in February 2013 but withdrew from the squad due to injury. Scougall's impressive form at Sheffield United earned him a recall to the Under-21s for a 2015 Under-21 Euro Qualifying match against the Netherlands on 28 May 2014, where he went on to make his second appearance for the under-21s as 75th-minute substitute in a 6–1 defeat.

Personal life
Born in Edinburgh, Scougall is the younger brother of former Dunfermline Athletic and East Fife youth player Alex Scougall. Scougall almost quit football when he was released by Hibernian. He worked part-time on the checkout at Sainsbury's and considered applying for a job alongside his father in the roads department at Edinburgh council.

Career statistics

References

External links

Stefan Scougall Profile at Sheffield United F.C.

1992 births
Living people
Footballers from Edinburgh
Scottish footballers
Scotland under-21 international footballers
Association football midfielders
Hibernian F.C. players
Dunfermline Athletic F.C. players
Livingston F.C. players
Sheffield United F.C. players
Scottish Football League players
Scottish Professional Football League players
English Football League players
St Johnstone F.C. players
Carlisle United F.C. players
Alloa Athletic F.C. players